is a railway station on the Hitahikosan Line in Soeda, Fukuoka, Japan, operated by Kyushu Railway Company (JR Kyushu).

Lines
Nishi-Soeda Station is served by the Hitahikosan Line.

Adjacent stations

See also
 List of railway stations in Japan

External links

  

Railway stations in Fukuoka Prefecture
Railway stations in Japan opened in 1903